Amr Adel (born 5 December 1980) is an Egyptian football defender. He currently plays for Egyptian club Al-Ittihad Al-Sakndary, having previously played for Zamalek, El Geish and Wadi Degla. Amr plays across the back three, four or five, but is usually centre-back. He is known for his no-nonsense style of defending.

References

1980 births
Living people
Egyptian footballers
Wadi Degla SC players
Association football defenders